Karl Heinzle (born 31 July 1960) is an Austrian ice hockey player. He competed in the men's tournament at the 1994 Winter Olympics.

References

1960 births
Living people
Austrian ice hockey players
Olympic ice hockey players of Austria
Ice hockey players at the 1994 Winter Olympics
People from Feldkirch, Vorarlberg
Sportspeople from Vorarlberg
20th-century Austrian people